On 6 November 2019, fifteen people were killed and another five injured in an attack on a security checkpoint in Yala Province, Thailand. Among the dead and injured were a police officer and many village defense volunteers. A total of ten men and five women died in the attack, making it the largest loss of village defense forces in a single attack during the South Thailand insurgency.

The attack resulted in the looting of eight guns that the victims possessed, including one M16, two shotguns, and five pistols. To disrupt the efforts of the officers tracking them, the attackers had sprinkled tire spikes, cut down trees, and burned tires on roads during the attack.

References

2019 in Thailand
November 2019 crimes in Asia
South Thailand insurgency
Terrorist incidents in Asia in 2019
Yala province
2019 murders in Thailand 
2019 crimes in Thailand